Lytkarino is a town in Moscow Oblast, Russia, located on the left bank of the Moskva River  southeast of Moscow (from MKAD). Population:

History
Lytkarino was founded in the first half of the 15th century as a village of the same name and granted town status in 1957.

Administrative and municipal status
Within the framework of administrative divisions, it is incorporated as Lytkarino Town Under Oblast Jurisdiction—an administrative unit with the status equal to that of the districts. As a municipal division, Lytkarino Town Under Oblast Jurisdiction is incorporated as Lytkarino Urban Okrug.

Notable residents 

Dmitri Sadov (born 1997), football player
Evgeny Stalev (born 1979), cue sports player

See also
 Lytkarino Optical Glass Plant

References

Notes

Sources

Cities and towns in Moscow Oblast
Naukograds